A New Athens may refer to:
 A New Athens (novel), a 1977 novel by Hugh Hood
 A New Athens (album), a 2010 album by The Bluetones

See also
 New Athens (disambiguation)